The men's 4 × 100 metres relay event at the 1936 Olympic Games took place on August 9. The United States team of Jesse Owens, Ralph Metcalfe, Foy Draper and Frank Wykoff won in a world record time of 39.8.

Marty Glickman and Sam Stoller were originally slated to compete in the American relay team but were replaced by Owens and Metcalfe prior to the start of the race. There were speculations that their Jewish heritage contributed to the decision "not to embarrass the German hosts"; however, given that African-Americans were also heavily disliked by the Nazis, Glickman and Stoller's replacement with black American athletes Owens and Metcalfe does not support this theory. Others state that Owens and Metcalfe were in a better physical condition, and that was the main reason behind the replacement.

Results

Heats

The fastest two teams in each of the three heats advanced to the final round.

Heat 1

Heat 2

Heat 3

Final

Key: DSQ = Disqualified, WR = World record

References

Men's 4x100 metres relay
Relay foot races at the Olympics
Men's events at the 1936 Summer Olympics